Bagshot railway station serves the village of Bagshot, in the west of Surrey, England. The station, and all trains calling there, are operated by South Western Railway.

History
The station was opened by the London and South Western Railway, it became part of the Southern Railway  during the Grouping of 1923. The station then passed on to the Southern Region of British Railways on nationalisation in 1948.

When Sectorisation was introduced in the 1980s, the station was served by Network SouthEast 
until the Privatisation of British Railways.

Services
Trains operate between Ascot and Aldershot, every 30 minutes Monday to Saturday and on Sundays, services run between Ascot and Guildford.  On Mondays to Fridays, there are three trains per day that continue beyond Ascot to London Waterloo in the morning peak period, and two from London in the evening.

Services are run using a four carriage Class 450, which 2 cycles can be carried per train.

References

 
 
 
 Station on navigable O.S. map

External links

Railway stations in Surrey
DfT Category E stations
Former London and South Western Railway stations
Railway stations in Great Britain opened in 1878
Railway stations served by South Western Railway